Nirankar is one of the many attributes associated to God in Sikhism and means The Formless One. The word has its roots in  nirākārā and is a compound of two words "Nir" meaning Without and Akar (or Akaar), Shape or Form; hence, The Formless. 

It is used as a name for The Almighty in Guru Granth Sahib.

References

Sikh terminology
Names of God in Sikhism